Bianca Schenk (24 April 1918 – 2 September 2000) was an Austrian figure skater. She competed at the 1936 Winter Olympics.

References

1918 births
2000 deaths
Figure skaters at the 1936 Winter Olympics
Olympic figure skaters of Austria
Austrian female single skaters